Attorney General Fairchild may refer to:

Charles S. Fairchild (1842–1924), Attorney General of New York
Thomas E. Fairchild (1912–2007), Attorney General of Wisconsin

See also
General Fairchild (disambiguation)